Maynard Cooper & Gale is an American full service law firm based in Birmingham, Alabama, with offices in New York City, San Francisco, Miami, Des Moines, Nashville, Dallas, Orlando, Century City, California and Washington D.C., as well as three additional offices in Alabama located in Huntsville, Montgomery and Mobile. Founded in 1984, it is one of Alabama's largest law firms with over 300 attorneys. The firm is listed by the National Law Journal as one of the 250 Largest American Law Firms in its NLJ 250.

Practice areas
Maynard Cooper & Gale is a full service law firm representing a broad and diverse client base, including Fortune 100 companies, international, national, state and local business entities, new business ventures, charities and individuals. The firm's attorneys handle matters for clients across the United States, as well as internationally, representing virtually all industries including banking and financial services, automotive, aerospace, manufacturing, healthcare, insurance, natural resources, education, government, real estate, construction, consumer products and retail, biotechnology, pharmaceuticals, maritime and commercial transportation.

Notable lawyers
Drayton Nabers Jr. – Chief Justice of the Alabama Supreme Court from 2004 to 2007
Terri Sewell – U.S. Representative for Alabama's 7th congressional district.
C. C. Torbert Jr. – Chief Justice of the Alabama Supreme Court from 1977 to 1989

References

External links
Maynard, Cooper & Gale Website
Moseley & Martinez Lawyers Website
DUI: What It Means For Driver’s License

Law firms established in 1984
Law firms based in Birmingham, Alabama